This list is of those countries who have won an indoor volleyball world medal, referring to any of the Men's and Women's World Championship, Men's and Women's World Cup, Olympic Games, men's and women's Volleyball Nations League (replacing FIVB World League and FIVB World Grand Prix respectively) or FIVB Volleyball World Grand Champions Cup.

Men's Volleyball World Medalists

1949–1989

1990–present

World League (1990–2017)

Volleyball Nations League (2018–present)

Men's Medals summary

Medals Summary Excluding World League and Volleyball Nations League

World League and Volleyball Nations League Medals Summary

  FIVB considers Russia (Since 1993) as the inheritor of the records of Soviet Union (1948–1991) and CIS (1992).
  FIVB considers Czech Republic (Since 1994) as the inheritor of the records of Czechoslovakia (1948–1993).
  After German reunification, West Germany (1949–1990) was renamed Germany (Since 1991) and they absorbed East Germany (1949–1990) with the records.
  FIVB considers Serbia (Since 2007) as the inheritor of the records of SFR Yugoslavia (1948–1991), FR Yugoslavia (1992–2002) and Serbia and Montenegro (2003–2006).

Women's Volleyball World Medalists

1952–1992

1993–2017

World Grand Prix (1993–2017)

Volleyball Nations League (2018–present)

Women's Medals Summary

Medals Summary Excluding World Grand Prix and Volleyball Nations League

 FIVB considers Russia (Since 1993) as the inheritor of the records of Soviet Union (1948–1991) and CIS (1992).
 After German reunification, West Germany (1949–1990) was renamed Germany (Since 1991) and they absorbed East Germany (1949–1990) with the records.
 FIVB considers Czech Republic (Since 1994) as the inheritor of the records of Czechoslovakia (1948–1993).
 FIVB considers Serbia (Since 2007) as the inheritor of the records of SFR Yugoslavia (1948–1991), FR Yugoslavia (1992–2002) and Serbia and Montenegro (2003–2006).

World Grand Prix and Volleyball Nations League Medals Summary

See also

Volleyball at the Summer Olympics
FIVB Volleyball Men's World Championship
FIVB Volleyball Women's World Championship
FIVB Volleyball Men's World Cup
FIVB Volleyball Women's World Cup
FIVB Volleyball World Grand Champions Cup
FIVB Volleyball World League
FIVB Volleyball World Grand Prix
FIVB Volleyball Men's Nations League
FIVB Volleyball Women's Nations League

References

Volleyball competitions
Volleyball-related lists